Johnny Darrell (July 23, 1940 – October 7, 1997) was an American country music artist.
Darrell was born in Hopewell, Alabama but grew up in Marietta, Georgia. After a stint in the army, he moved to Nashville and began managing a Holiday Inn near Music Row, when he was discovered by Kelso Herstin, a producer working for United Artists, on the recommendation of Bobby Bare. In his recording career, Darrell established a trend of introducing "lyrically adventurous" songs that later became major hits for other artists.

His first single, a version of Curly Putman's "Green Green Grass of Home" was issued in 1965, followed by "As Long as the Wind Blows" in 1966, which made the country Top 30 and saw Darrell being named "Most Promising Male Artist" by Cashbox. He was the first to record the Mel Tillis song "Ruby, Don't Take Your Love to Town", which became a top ten hit for him in 1967 and later a hit for Kenny Rogers. This was followed by his performance of Dallas Frazier's "The Son of Hickory Holler's Tramp" in 1968, and the crossover hit "With Pen in Hand", which would later become a hit for Vikki Carr. In the 1970s, Darrell was associated with the Outlaw country movement. Darrell suffered from diabetes, a disease which would impair his health and ability to perform. Darrell died from the disease at age 57 in Kennesaw, Georgia, and was survived by his wife Jody.

Discography

Albums

Singles

References

External links

1940 births
1997 deaths
People from Cleburne County, Alabama
Country musicians from Alabama
American country singer-songwriters
United Artists Records artists
20th-century American singers
Singer-songwriters from Alabama